The 1961 World Table Tennis Championships – Swaythling Cup (men's team) was the 26th edition of the men's team championship.  

China won the gold medal defeating Japan 5–3 in the decisive final group match. Hungary won the bronze medal after finishing third in the final group.

Medalists

Team

Swaythling Cup tables

Group A

Group B

Group C

Final group results

Final standings

Decisive final group match

See also
List of World Table Tennis Championships medalists

References

-